Tomasz Kiendyś (born 23 June 1977) is a Polish former racing cyclist, who competed professionally between 2001 and 2016, for the Mikomax, Knauf Team and  squads. He rode at the 2014 UCI Road World Championships.

Major results

2001
 8th Memoriał Andrzeja Trochanowskiego
2002
 9th Memoriał Andrzeja Trochanowskiego
2004
 3rd Overall Szlakiem Grodów Piastowskich
1st Mountains classification
 10th Overall Peace Race
2005
 1st Szlakiem Walk Majora Hubala
 7th Sparkassen Giro Bochum
 8th Overall Flèche du Sud
2006
 1st Overall Szlakiem Grodów Piastowskich
1st Stage 2 (ITT)
 1st Overall Dookoła Mazowsza
 1st Stage 2 Rhône-Alpes Isère Tour
 3rd Tartu GP
 9th Schaal Sels
 10th Overall Course de Solidarność et des Champions Olympiques
1st Stage 5
 10th Memoriał Andrzeja Trochanowskiego
 10th Neuseen Classics
2007
 1st Overall Szlakiem Grodów Piastowskich
1st Stages 1 & 2 (ITT)
 1st Overall Szlakiem Walk Majora Hubala
 2nd Overall Flèche du Sud
1st Prologue
 5th Memoriał Andrzeja Trochanowskiego
 8th Boucle de l'Artois
 9th Overall Bałtyk–Karkonosze Tour
 9th Grand Prix de la ville de Nogent-sur-Oise
2008
 1st Overall Szlakiem Walk Majora Hubala
1st Stage 2
 1st Memoriał Andrzeja Trochanowskiego
 1st Grand Prix Jasnej Góry
 1st Stage 6 Dookoła Mazowsza
 2nd Overall Szlakiem Grodów Piastowskich
1st Stage 4 (ITT)
 4th Pomorski Klasyk
 6th Tallinn–Tartu GP
 6th Puchar Ministra Obrony Narodowej
 8th Overall Course de Solidarność et des Champions Olympiques
2009
 1st Puchar Ministra Obrony Narodowej
 1st Stage 5 Tour du Maroc
 2nd Memoriał Andrzeja Trochanowskiego
 3rd Overall Dookoła Mazowsza
 6th Overall Tour de Taiwan
1st Stage 7
 10th Overall Tour of Małopolska
2010
 1st Overall Szlakiem Walk Majora Hubala
1st Stage 1
 2nd Grand Prix Jasnej Góry
 6th Pomerania Tour
 8th Overall Szlakiem Grodów Piastowskich
2011
 1st Puchar Ministra Obrony Narodowej
 5th Overall Dookoła Mazowsza
 5th GP Herning
2012
 1st Stage 1 Bałtyk–Karkonosze Tour
 5th Overall Dookoła Mazowsza
2013
 4th Puchar Ministra Obrony Narodowej
 5th Overall Dookoła Mazowsza
 8th Memoriał Andrzeja Trochanowskiego
2014
 7th Overall Dookoła Mazowsza
1st Stage 1 (TTT)
 9th Overall Tour of Estonia
2015
 1st Stage 1b (TTT) Settimana Internazionale di Coppi e Bartali
 7th Overall Dookoła Mazowsza
2016
 1st Stage 3 Dookoła Mazowsza
 2nd Memorial Grundmanna I Wizowskiego

References

External links

1977 births
Living people
Polish male cyclists
People from Krosno Odrzańskie
Sportspeople from Lubusz Voivodeship